The Dhyana Buddha is a statue of Gautama Buddha seated in a meditative posture located in Amaravathi of Andhra Pradesh, India. It is embellished with modern reproductions of sculptures from the Amaravati School of art which flourished in the region in 200 BC to 200 AD.

History 

The recorded history of Amaravati and nearby Dharanikota dates to the 5th century BC. It was the capital of Satavahanas who ruled from the 3rd century BC to 3rd century AD who also patronized Buddhism along with Hinduism. The most important historic monument in Amaravathi town is the Mahachaitya. It is protected by the Archaeological Survey of India which maintains a site museum known as old museum.

The project was conceived by R. Mallikarjuna Rao in 2002, who was then serving as the Deputy Director, Social Welfare Department in Guntur district of Andhra Pradesh. Mallikarjuna Rao was inspired by the magnificence of the Amaravati School of Art which flourished in the region circa 200 BC – 200 AD and wanted to recreate it. The Guntur district administration provided 4.5 acre of land and the construction work began in 2003–04. The funds for the project were provided by the Andhra Pradesh state government, Guntur district administration, Dalai Lama, Tourism Department, Kalachakra organisers Norbulingka, and also from the sale of greeting cards and paintings done by Mallikarjuna Rao. The Department of Tourism took over the project in 2007. The construction was completed in 2015.

Location and structure 

Structure and significance 

The statue was commissioned in 2003 and completed in 2015. The statue stands on massive Lotus pandal supported by eight pillars symbolizing the Buddha's eight fold path to attain salvation. The area is divided into four zones depicting the noble truths and five ayaka pillars for stages of life. APTDC is going to complete the Theme Park in front of the statue which is said to be opened for the public in 2018.

The statue has a three-layered museum in the base underneath it, which consists of sculptures of Amaravati Art depicting scenes with Buddhist significance, most modern copies of the original reliefs from the Amaravati Mahachaitya stupa which are now in museums around India and the world.

See also

 List of tallest statues
 List of statues

References 

Buddha statues in India
Buildings and structures in Guntur district
Stone Buddha statues
Concrete Buddha statues
Colossal statues in India
Amaravati
2015 establishments in Andhra Pradesh
2015 sculptures